Kevin Krautgartner (born 1988) is a German architectural and landscape photographer, best known for his aerial images of urban and large ground spaces highlighting the aesthetic value of colors, lines and geometric patterns in them. His oeuvre has been awarded at international contests, and featured in mainstream media.

Life and work 
Krautgartner was born in 1988 in Schwelm, Germany and currently lives and works in Wuppertal.

He graduated from the Dortmund University of Applied Sciences and Arts with a degree in photography and graphic design. Digital photography is the basis for his work today. He uses helicopters and light planes to capture his objects -architectural interiors, urban skylines, remote landscapes- from different perspectives which he later uses to digitally select and frame aesthetically appealing views. His landscapes include icy mountains, volcanoes, glaciers, fjords and salt fields in many countries.

Krautgartner's work has been used in NatGeo, Der Spiegel, Colossal, The Mirror, Novosti,  FAZ, Die Welt and  WDR, and Yahoo! News, which annotated his images as being evocative of abstract masterpieces.

Exhibitions 
 2021  Exhibition at South Australian Museum, Adelaide, Australia
 2022  Exhibition at Christopher Martin Gallery, Dallas TX, USA
 2022  Exhibition at VINTA Series Showroom, Hamburg, Germany

Awards 
 2014 Winner of the EISA MAESTRO Audience Award
 2016 Wuppertaler-Photoaward
 2018 Epson Pano Awards / Highest Scoring Aerial Image
 2019 Fine Art Photography Awards, Gold in Travel for his series The Long Journey
 2019 CIWEM Environmental Photographer of the Year, shortlisted for Colors of the Salt
 2019 One Eyeland Fine Art Photo Award: a)International, Silver and Bronze prizes in Architecture, Silver and Bronze in Abstract; National: Germany Top Rank
 2019 101 International Landscape Photographer of the year for River Delta, Iceland
 2019 Lynx International Award, First Prize in Photography
 2019 Young Guns 17 Award in Photography
 2019 Epson International Pano Award, Fourth place Gold, in Built Environment/Architecture for Office Space No. 6
 2019/2020 Fine Art Photography Award, 1st Place Winner in Nature for River Flame (single)
 2020 Moscow International Photography Award, Gold in Nature/Aerial for Traces of Water
 2020 ADC International Award, in Drone / Aerial /Series for Face of Bauxite Mining – Source of Our Aluminium
 2020 Vienna International Photo Award, winners shortlist
 2020 Andrei Stenin Award, winners shortlist
2020  PX3 - Prix de la Photographie, "Gold" Winner
2021  TIFA Awards, Gold Award
2022  The Independent Photographer: Landscape Award

Publications

References

External links 
 

1988 births
21st-century German photographers
Aerial photographers
Living people